Fernando Niño de Guevara (1541 – 8 January 1609) was a Spanish cardinal who was also Archbishop of Seville and Grand Inquisitor of Spain.

Biography

Fernando Niño de Guevara was born in Toledo, Spain in 1541, the son of Rodrigo Niño, Marquis of Tejares.  An uncle, also named Fernando Niño de Guevara (d. 1552), was Archbishop of Granada from 1542 to 1552.  He studied law at the University of Salamanca.  He then moved to Cuenca, Spain, where he became archdeacon of the cathedral.  In 1570, he became an oidor in Valladolid.  He became a member of the Council of Castile in 1580.

On 3 December 1599 he was appointed Grand Inquisitor of Spain.  During his tenure as Grand Inquisitor, the Spanish Inquisition burned 240 heretics, plus 96 in effigy.  1,628 other individuals were found guilty and subjected to lesser penalties.

On 10 Oct 1599, he was consecrated bishop by Pope Clement VIII with Camillo Borghese, Cardinal-Priest of Santi Giovanni e Paolo, and Alfonso Visconti, Bishop of Cervia, serving as co-consecrators.

In 1600 he had a portrait painted by El Greco. On 30 April 1601 he was also appointed Archbishop of Seville.

Fernando Niño de Guevara engaged the Jesuits in a dispute about the nature of papal authority.  As a result, Pope Clement VIII prevailed on Philip III of Spain to induce him to resign as Grand Inquisitor in 1602.

He did, however, retain his duties as Archbishop of Seville.  In this capacity, he called a synod in 1604 in order to suppress the confraternities and replace them with similar institutions dominated by clerics.

He died, probably in Seville, on 8 January 1609.  He is buried in the Convent of San Pablo in Toledo.

Episcopal succession
While bishop, he was the principal consecrator of:
Tomás de Borja, Bishop of Malaga (1600);
Juan Bautista Acevedo Muñoz, Bishop of Valladolid (1601); 
Juan de la Sal, Titular Bishop of Hippo Diarrhytus and Auxiliary Bishop of Seville (1603); and
Francisco de Vera-Villavicencio, Titular Bishop of Madaurus and Auxiliary Bishop of Seville (1603).

References

This page is based on this page on Spanish Wikipedia.

1541 births
1609 deaths
Grand Inquisitors of Spain
Roman Catholic archbishops of Seville
People from Toledo, Spain
17th-century Roman Catholic archbishops in Spain
University of Salamanca alumni
Archbishops of Granada